David Nahmad (born 1947) is a Monegasque billionaire and former fine art dealer. A descendant of a Syrian Jewish art family residing in Monaco, he and his relations are perhaps the single biggest buying force in fine art.

Origin
The roots of the Nahmad family are in Aleppo, Syria, where Sephardic Jewish banker Hillel Nahmad lived until just after the Second World War. Following anti-Jewish violence in 1947, Hillel Nahmad moved to Beirut, Lebanon and when the situation there became difficult, Hillel took his three sons, Joseph (Giuseppe), Ezra and David, to Milan in the early 1960s.

Art dealing
As teenagers in the 1960s, they began to deal in art. Ezra and David used free-time after school to trade on the Italian stock market. At a Juan Gris exhibition in Rome organised by cubist dealer Daniel-Henry Kahnweiler, Ezra and David bought two works – the only pieces sold. Kahnweiler befriended them, selling them works by Pablo Picasso, Georges Braque, and Juan Gris. With the emergence of the Red Brigades terror group in the 1970s, Milan was perceived as too dangerous, and the family moved again. Joseph and Ezra headed for Monaco, and David to New York City.

Helly Nahmad Gallery, on Madison Avenue, is a company run by David’s son Hillel "Helly" Nahmad, who took over his father’s earlier Davlyn Gallery in 2000.

Jeffrey Deitch, a former dealer and current director of the Museum of Contemporary Art, Los Angeles, once described the Nahmads as "like a major brokerage firm in the stock market", adding: "The market needs a force like this to function." Sarah Thornton discusses their significant influence on the auction market Seven Days in the Art World.

According to the cartel presented at the Beyeler Fondation in Basel during The young Picasso Periods blue and pink exhibition, the Nahmad collection now owns Young Girl with a Flower Basket (1905), bought in 2018 for 115 million dollars at the Rockefeller sale at Christie's.

Seated Man with a Cane

In 2011, Philippe Maestracci filed suit in the United States District Court for the Southern District of New York, seeking title to the 1918 Amedeo Modigliani painting Seated Man with a Cane, valued at more than $25 million.  Maestracci claimed that the painting had been looted from his grandfather, Oscar Stettiner, during World War II.  In 2012, after Defendants moved to dismiss, Maestracci’s counsel withdrew that complaint.  In 2015, the Limited Ancillary Administrator for the Estate of Oscar Stettiner filed suit in the Supreme Court of the State of New York, County of New York, seeking the same relief sought in federal court. The amended complaint in that action was the subject of a recent motion to dismiss with Defendants’ counsel arguing, among other things, that Defendants purchased the painting in good faith at a public Christie’s auction in London, that Oscar Stettiner did not actually own the subject painting, and that provenance research about the painting is being provided by experts in the field. Plaintiff's counsel contends that this painting had been sold out of the possessions of Jewish art dealer Oscar Stettiner by an administrator appointed under the Nazi occupation of Paris.

Personal life
Nahmad is married to Colette Nahmad. They have three children, Helly Nahmad, Joe Nahmad, and Marielle Safra. Marielle is married to Edmond M. Safra, son of the late Brazilian banker Moise Safra.

He is the 1996 Backgammon World Champion and is known for betting large amounts of money on the game.

References

Living people
1947 births
Lebanese art collectors
Lebanese art dealers
Lebanese billionaires
Lebanese emigrants to Monaco
Lebanese people of Syrian-Jewish descent
Lebanese Jews
David
Businesspeople from Beirut
People named in the Panama Papers
Monegasque billionaires
Monegasque people of Lebanese-Jewish descent
Monegasque art collectors
Monegasque Jews
Asian Sephardi Jews
European Sephardi Jews